This is a list of places in Cuba.

Cities 

Bayamo
Camagüey
Ciego de Ávila
Cienfuegos
Guantánamo
Havana
Holguín
Las Tunas
Matanzas
Pinar del Río
Sancti Spíritus
Santa Clara
Santiago de Cuba
Manzanillo

Provinces 

 Camagüey Province
 Ciego de Ávila Province
 Cienfuegos Province
 Ciudad de La Habana
 Granma Province
 Guantánamo Province
 Holguín Province
 La Habana Province (1976-2011)
 Artemisa Province (2011–present)
 Mayabeque Province (2011–present)
 Las Tunas Province
 Matanzas Province
 Pinar del Río Province
 Sancti Spiritus Province
 Santiago de Cuba Province
 Villa Clara Province

Historic provinces 
 Pinar del Río
 La Habana
 Matanzas
 Las Villas (before 1940, "Santa Clara"), contained the present day provinces of Cienfuegos, Villa Clara and Sancti Spíritus
 Camagüey (before 1899, "Puerto Príncipe"), contained the present day provinces of Camagüey and Ciego de Ávila
 Oriente (before 1905, "Santiago de Cuba"), contained the present day provinces of Las Tunas, Granma, Holguín, Santiago de Cuba and Guantánamo

Special territories 
 Guantanamo Bay Naval Base, treaty enclave of the United States

Geographic features 

 Gulfs and bays: Gulf of Batabanó, Bay of Havana, Ensenada de la Broa, Bay of Cárdenas, Gulf of Cazones, Gulf of Guacanayabo, Guantánamo Bay, Bay of Pigs, Bay of Santa Clara, Bay of Matanzas
 Islands: Colorados Archipelago; Canarreos Archipelago: Isla de la Juventud (Isla de Pinos), Cayo Largo del Sur, Ernst Thälmann Island (Cayo Blanco), Jardines del Rey, Sabana-Camaguey Archipelago: Cayo Coco, Cayo Romano, Cayo Guajaba, Cayo Guillermo, Cayo Sabinal; Jardines de la Reina; Cayo Saetia
 Rivers: Almendares River, Cauto River, Toa River
 Lakes: Laguna de Leche, Ariguanabo, Zaza Reservoir (man-made)
 Mountains: Loma del Capiro, Topes de Collantes, Escambray Mountains, Mogotes de Jumagua, Sierra Cristal, Sierra Maestra, Sierra del Rosario, San Juan Hill, Cuchillas del Toa, Pico Turquino, El Yunque
 Other: Guanahacabibes Peninsula, Hicacos Peninsula, Viñales Valley, Zapata Peninsula, Escaleras de Jaruco

Municipalities

The provinces of Cuba are divided into 200 municipalities (municipios). They were defined by Cuban Law Number 1304 of July 3, 1976.

References

 
Places
Cuba